"Have You Ever Been in Love" is a song by Canadian recording artist Celine Dion, recorded first for her seventh English studio album A New Day Has Come (2002) and was later included on her eight English studio album One Heart (2003). The song is a power ballad, written by Anders Bagge, Peer Åström, Tom Nichols, Daryl Hall and Laila Bagge, while production was handled by Bagge & Peer.

"Have You Ever Been in Love" builds from a gentle, piano-laced opening into a theatrical, string-framed climax. The song received acclaim from music critics, while being reviewed in both albums. Many critics called it a classic-sounding ballad and one of the strongest cuts from the album. Critics also noted similarities between Dion and Barbra Streisand.

"Have You Ever Been in Love" was released on 14 April 2003, as One Heart's second (promotional only) single in the United States and Canada, while on 3 November 2003, it was released as the third commercial single in selected European countries. The song spent fourteen weeks at number 2 on the US Hot Adult Contemporary Tracks, setting a record for most weeks at the second position. The music video was shot between 29–30 April 2003 in Los Angeles and released on 2 June 2003.

Background and release
"Have You Ever Been in Love" was composed by Anders Bagge, Peer Åström, Tom Nichols, Daryl Hall and Laila Bagge, while production was handled by Bagge & Peer. The power ballad builds from a gentle, piano-laced opening into a theatrical, string-framed climax. The song appeared first on Dion's 2002 album A New Day Has Come. Although not changed, it was included on her 2003 album One Heart. The song was released on 14 April 2003, as One Heart's second (promotional only) single in the United States and Canada, while on 3 November 2003, it was released as the third commercial single in selected European countries.

Some years after the album's release, a sheet of paper with Spanish lyrics for this song leaked into the Internet. Dion's signature appeared on the sheet as well as phonetical notes under the adapted lyrics. The title came to be "¿Sabes Cómo Es El Amor?" and next to it appeared the original title in brackets ("Have you Ever Been In Love?"), so a Spanish version for this song is rumoured to have been also recorded, though it remains unreleased to this day. The date in the sheet was 6 May 2003, so it is not certain whether it was recorded for her 2003 One Heart album (probably to offer a different version of the song) or for her 2002 A New Day Has Come album.

Critical reception
Larry Flick from Billboard wrote that "at a time when music is frightfully aggressive and the world at large is fraught with turmoil, a classic Dion power ballad is a warm source of comfort." All along, Dion offers an "appealing palette of vocal colors that range from delicate and breathy to full-bodied and appropriately dramatic." Ken Tucker of Entertainment Weekly wrote that the song "builds in intensity to sound like a James Bond movie theme as delivered by Barbra Streisand -- which is to say, it's over-the-top fun." Stephen Thomas Erlewine of AllMusic echoed the same thought, calling it an "unapologetically Barbra Streisand-esque." He also picked it as one of the best tracks on both albums ("A New Day Has Come" and "One Heart"). Barnes & Noble praised the track, calling it a "soaring" ballad. Rebecca Wallwork was less impressed, commenting that "it stick to the tried-and-true formula of allowing Dion's impressive voice to take center stage."

Elisabeth Vincentelli also from Entertainment Weekly, commented: "Dion keeps the belting in check throughout most of One Heart, so when she does go for the dunk, as on Have You Ever Been in Love, the sense of gleeful release is particularly satisfying. (The track -- a sweeping, string-laden '70s-style ballad cowritten by Daryl Hall -- is a repeat from last year's A New Day Has Come.) The song is the best example of the rock-solid foundation One Heart is built on: Dion's uncanny ability to infuse sincerity into aural Hallmark cards and sound like the only person on earth who believes in true love." Chuck Arnold of People called it "one of the strongest cuts from the album", while Sal Cinquemani from Slant Magazine named it a "classic-sounding ballad". 
Picks and Pans reviewers Chuck Arnold and Ralph Novak wrote, while reviewing the One Heart album: "Two of the strongest cuts are actually recycled from last year's A New Day Has Come: "Have You Ever Been in Love" and a ballad version of "Sorry for Love." Christopher Smith from TalkAboutPopMusic described the song as a "guitar-laced piece of theatre that Celine wrestles with, with passion from the halfway mark, welcoming back ‘that voice’ for a new century, before ending with her usual tenderness and seduction."

Commercial performance
The song spent fourteen weeks at number two on the US Adult Contemporary chart, setting a record for most weeks at the second position. In Sweden, the song debuted at number 57 on 14 November 2003, dropping from the chart the following week. However, it re-entered at number 59, on 28 November 2003, spending two weeks on the Swedish charts.

Awards
In 2004, "Have You Ever Been in Love" won ASCAP London Award and BMI London Award for one of the Most Performed Songs in the United States.

Music video

A recording of Dion performing the song in The Colosseum at Caesars Palace, Las Vegas was supposed to be the music video. However, Sony Music Entertainment asked Antti Jokinen to make a new one. The "Have You Ever Been in Love" music video was shot between 29–30 April 2003 in Los Angeles and released on 2 June 2003. It was included later on the enhanced CD single.

The music video features Dion standing on a long pier extending over a dry landscape. There are various intermittent shots of couples and children, including some by a large branch and on a wrecked boat. As the song builds, the landscape becomes flooded with water, lifting the boat and filling the dry space under the pier. The video ends with Dion singing on the pier in front of a sunset.

Live performances and inclusions
Dion performed this song (between March and November 2003) five nights a week during her show A New Day... at Caesars Palace, Las Vegas. Additionally, Dion performed the song on VH1 Divas and the Today Show that same year.

In October 2008, "Have You Ever Been in Love" was included on the European version of My Love: Ultimate Essential Collection greatest hits.

Track listing and formats
European CD single
"Have You Ever Been in Love" – 4:08
"All by Myself" – 5:12

European CD maxi-single
"Have You Ever Been in Love" – 4:08
"Have You Ever Been in Love" (Edit) – 2:58
"All by Myself" – 5:12
"Have You Ever Been in Love" (Video) – 4:07

Charts

Weekly charts

Year-end charts

References

Celine Dion songs
2003 singles
2002 songs
Songs written by Daryl Hall
Songs written by Peer Åström
Songs written by Anders Bagge
Pop ballads
Songs written by Tom Nichols (songwriter)
2000s ballads